Cryptic mimicry is observed in animals as well as plants. In animals, this may involve nocturnality, camouflage, subterranean lifestyle, and mimicry. Generally, plant herbivores are visually oriented. So a mimicking plant should strongly resemble its host; this can be done through visual and/or textural change. Previous criteria for mimicry include similarity of leaf dimensions, leaf presentation, and intermodal distances between the host and mimicking plant.

Australian mistletoe and Boquila trifoliolata are well known examples of this mimicry. Researchers hypothesize that crypsis is used to reduce the likelihood of vertebrate herbivory and thus improve the survivability and fitness of the mimicking plant.

Mistletoe
Mistletoe, or Viscum album, is an obligate hemi-parasite meaning it attaches to its host tree and extracts water and nutrients. Australia is home to over 90 species of mistletoe, with 70 being native. Studies evaluating the role of crypsis on herbivory measure leaf quality, such as nitrogen and protein levels, water content, etc. Ehleringer et al. examined nitrogen levels, as an indicator of protein status, of mistletoe and their host (Acacia, Cassia, Casuarina, Ceriops, and Eucalyptus) to determine if mimicry reduced herbivory in the plant. 

One hypothesis tested was mistletoe that show mimicry would have higher nitrogen levels and have a selective advantage through reduced herbivory. A second hypothesis tested was mistletoe that do not demonstrate mimicry would have lower nitrogen levels and appear at a lower nutritional status and have reduced herbivory as a result. Seemingly, the researchers thought that the act of mimicry would increase nitrogen levels and depending on nutritional status and detectability, herbivory would be affected. Previous studies have shown that animals may prefer different food resources depending on their water content, vitamins, carbohydrates and energy needs, and appearance might play into an animal’s perception and preference.

Record of Kjeldahl nitrogen in the leaves was taken to measure reduced nitrogen levels in the mistletoe, which would affect amino acids, proteins, etc, and possible preference of herbivores. From their results, Ehleringer et al. found that the majority (17 of 22) of mimetic mistletoe had nitrogen levels that were either equal to or greater than their hosts. However, mistletoe that mimicked the Eucalyptus species had nitrogen levels lower or equal to their hosts. Eucalyptus typically has high oil content which is thought to be an anti-herbivory mechanism. One thought might be that in additional effort to avoid herbivory, having lower nitrogen levels and therefore lower nutrition, mistletoe would be less favorable to herbivores than the host Eucalyptus. Of the non-mimetic mistletoe, 15 of 26 had significantly lower nitrogen levels than their hosts. The lowered nitrogen would reflect lower protein levels and potentially lower nutrition to potential herbivores.

Ehleringer et al. can only make predictions about the mechanism of mimicry and herbivory rates as no herbivory was actually studied or measured in mistletoe and host plants.

Boquila
In their research, Gianoli and Carrasco-Urra demonstrate the effect cryptic mimicry can have on the herbivory of the Boquila trifoliolata. Native to the temperate rainforest of South America, Boquila is a climbing vine. Compared to other cryptic plants, Boquila is unique in its ability to mimic several hosts despite no parasitic relationships. Like others, Gianoli and Carrasco-Urra set out to prove that Boquila mimicry results in protection against herbivory. 

Boquila leaf traits (such as size, shape, color, orientation) were compared with its native host tree species to try to explain such wide morphological changes. Out of 11 traits, there was significant phenotypic association between 9 traits of the Boquila and host leaves. Leaves of unsupported vines growing on the ground did not differ from those of vines growing on leafless stems or trees; showing that when there is no leaf to mimic, climbing plants do not differ from unsupported plants.
It was measured that herbivory remained equal between climbing vines and unsupported hosts. Herbivory was significantly higher in vines growing unsupported than in vines climbing on trees. Lastly, herbivory on vines climbing leafless hosts was higher than in unsupported vines. These results suggest that the act of climbing is not enough to avoid herbivory, but additional mimicry of supported leaves may reduce herbivory rates.

An interesting note about the Boquila is that leaf mimicry can occur even when there is no contact between the vine and its host. High phenotypic plasticity allows the Boquila to mimic several hosts simultaneously but it does not explain the mechanism behind its mimicry.

Mechanism
Currently, there is no known explanation for leaf mimicry. In the Boquila, because mimicry is observed despite lack of physical contact between the vine and its host, hypotheses of plant volatile and horizontal gene transfer have been mentioned.

Volatile organic compounds have been shown to elicit defense responses in inter-plant and plant-plant situations. When attacked by herbivores, plants release a blend of volatiles that can initiate response in systemic leaves as well as neighboring plants. It has been observed that volatile signals increased the expression of genes related to plant defense and resulted in change to the transcriptome. In mimicry, response to volatiles could be gene edits in the plant, which could change the expression of certain genes and result in phenotypic change.
In the Venus fly trap, stimulation of mechanoreceptors and calcium release trigger jasmonic acid synthesis. Proteins and enzymes have been shown to be involved in transport and perception of volatiles. They could also play a role in the conversion of a volatile signal to a chemical product response e.g. salicylic acid and methyl salicylate. With the mistletoe, a possible line of study could be measuring nitrogen level change after mimicry to see if nitrogen is involved in perception of volatiles or if it changes as a result from perception.

Horizontal gene transfer involves movement of genetic material without being passed down to offspring. It plays an important role in the evolution of many organisms. It is hypothesized that transfer is conducted through a vector or is a result of plant-plant parasitism.
Little is known about how this method could be involved in plant mimicry but it is mentioned by Gianoli and Carrasco-Urra as an explanation that Boquila mimicry is observed depending on which host the plant is nearest to, despite previous contact. Possible transfer within close distances would explain varying amounts of mimicry seen in Boquila and its hosts.

Plant-plant interactions
Not much is known about the underlying mechanisms of how the mimicking plants and their hosts are able to communicate, or if they do at all. Kin recognition would be an area to further study as it might reveal more about volatile communication between plants. Heil and Karban note that the use of volatiles can be costly to the emitter which poses the question of competition and cost between the host and mimicker. If the host were to somehow recognize the mimicker as kin, it would offer potential reasoning for the exchange between the two. Similar to a study from Crepy et al. in which they noticed plants that recognized kin shifted their leaf position to benefit kin plants growing nearby. Close phenotypic association was observed and could be explored further. Others have discussed that instead of communication, Boquila and other plants eavesdrop on their hosts.

It might be that instead of the mimicking plant solely benefitting, the host plant could also experience reduced herbivory as potential herbivores might mistake the Boquila for the host. This would suggest that the relationship between mimicker and host is not just beneficial to the mimicker. Further research into the plant-plant interactions would need to be done in order to answer these questions.

References 

Mimicry